WLNM-LD (channel 29) is a low-power television station in Lansing, Michigan, United States. It is a translator of Onondaga-licensed NBC affiliate WILX-TV (channel 10) which is owned by Gray Television. WLNM-LD's transmitter is located on River Street along the Red Cedar River southeast of Lansing; its parent station maintains studios on American Road (near I-96) in the city.

History
WLNM-LD first signed-on the air in 1991 as W69BJ on channel 69, as a translator of Saginaw-based WAQP (channel 49), a station owned by Tri-State Christian Television (TCT). The station relocated to channel 27 as W27CN in November 2003.

The station was an owned-and-operated transmitter of TCT, which also carried many programs from Trinity Broadcasting Network (TBN). In 2007, TCT discontinued carriage of TBN programming, instead relying on productions of its own programs and direct carriage of programs from other ministries.

In July 2009, the station's digital transmitter was put into service with a flash-cut, ending its analog service and adding a -D suffix to its callsign at that time. The station's callsign changed to the lettered WLNM-LD on February 8, 2016.

On February 14, 2020, TCT agreed to sell WLNM-LD to Gray Television for $175,000; the sale, which was completed on May 1, includes a lease agreement allowing TCT to continue carrying a subchannel on the station for five years after closing. WLNM-LD has since operated as a translator of WILX-TV, allowing homes with issues receiving WILX-TV's VHF signal or only a UHF antenna to receive WILX-TV in some form.

Subchannels
The station's digital signal is multiplexed:

References

External links

NBC network affiliates
MeTV affiliates
Start TV affiliates
Story Television affiliates
Movies! affiliates
Decades (TV network) affiliates
Tri-State Christian Television affiliates
Gray Television
LNM-LD
Television channels and stations established in 1991
1991 establishments in Michigan
Low-power television stations in the United States